Daniel Alfonso Grueso Barco (born 30 July 1985 in Tuluá) is a Colombian sprinter who specializes in the 100 and 200 metres. His personal best time is 10.17 seconds in the 100 metres, achieved in November 2008 in Cali, and 20.49 seconds in the 200 metres, achieved in April 2010 in Mayagüez.

He finished eighth in 200 m at the 2004 World Junior Championships. He also competed at the 2007 World Championships and the 2008 Olympic Games without reaching the final. However, in Beijing he qualified for the second round after finishing fourth in his heat behind Asafa Powell, Kim Collins and Craig Pickering. His time of 10.35 was the fifth fastest losing time after the 10.25 of Nobuharu Asahara, advancing him to the second round. In that second round he finished in a time of 10.37 seconds, which was the eighth and last time of the heat, causing elimination. He also took part in the 200 metres individual, where he was eliminated after the first round as he placed seventh in his heat in a time of 21.15 seconds.

Personal bests
100 m: 10.17 (wind: +1.8 m/s) –  Cali, 25 November 2008
200 m: 20.49 (wind: -0.1 m/s) –  Mayagüez, 17 April 2010
400 m: 46.09 –  Ponce, 29 March 2008

Competition record

References

External links

1985 births
Living people
Sportspeople from Valle del Cauca Department
Colombian male sprinters
Athletes (track and field) at the 2008 Summer Olympics
Athletes (track and field) at the 2011 Pan American Games
Olympic athletes of Colombia
Pan American Games competitors for Colombia
South American Games bronze medalists for Colombia
South American Games medalists in athletics
Competitors at the 2006 South American Games
Competitors at the 2014 South American Games
21st-century Colombian people